openElement is a freeware website design and authoring application published by Element Technologie. The software is powered by Chromium, the Google Chrome engine, and runs on Microsoft Windows (XP, Vista, 7, 8, 10).

The current stable version is 1.57.

The software runs only on Windows and there is no plan to make it run on other operating systems

References

HTML editors
Freeware